The Ministry of Transport and Communications is a ministry in Zambia. It is headed by the Minister of Transport and Communications.

In 2011 the ministry was merged with the Ministry of Works And Supply to form the Ministry of Transport, Works, Supply and Communication. The merger was reversed in 2015.

List of ministers

Deputy ministers

References

External links
Official website

Transport
Transport in Zambia
 
Zambia